A corkscrew landing (also spiral landing) is a method of landing an aircraft that is intended to minimize the risk of the aircraft being hit by anti-aircraft fire from the ground on its way to a destination airport.  Instead of slow descent towards the airport, in a corkscrew landing the aircraft is positioned at high altitude above the airport, then descends rapidly in a spiral.  The maneuver is typically performed by pilots of military aircraft to avoid surface-to-air missiles.

Rationale

The purpose of a corkscrew landing is to minimize the chance of an aircraft being struck by ground fire such as surface-to-air missiles as it lands.

Technique

A corkscrew landing involves positioning the aircraft over the landing site at altitude, then descending in a steeply banked spiral path. This happens when the pilot of the aircraft bends the wings from their normal horizontal position, causing them to slice through the air going downwards. The pilot has to then straighten out the wings before the aircraft hits the ground, getting them back into the normal horizontal position. The aircraft's rate of descension suddenly falls and it touches down on a pad/runway.

History
The corkscrew landing maneuver has been reported as being performed in the Vietnam War.

It has also become the standard method of landing by airlines flying into Baghdad International Airport after a DHL cargo aircraft was struck and nearly destroyed by a surface-to-air missile during takeoff in November 2003.

References 
https://www.wkrn.com/news/what-is-a-corkscrew-landing-military-planes-taking-evasive-measures-at-kabul-airport/

Flight phases
Types of landing